Ocellularia brunneospora is a species of corticolous (bark-dwelling) lichen in the family Graphidaceae. Found in Thailand, it was formally described as a new species in 2002 by lichenologists Natsurang Homchantara and Brian J. Coppins. Ocellularia brunneospora is only known to occur at the type locality.

The lichen has a smooth and shiny, olive-grey thallus with a dense cortex, a continuous algal layer and a white medulla. Its apothecia are about 0.7 mm in diameter with a white-rimmed, round pore and carbonized (blackened) exciple. The ascospores are ellipsoid, thin walled and brown, and typically measure 11–13 by 6–7 μm. Ocellularia croceospora is similar in morphology, but differs in having colourless ascospores.

See also
 List of Ocellularia species

References

brunneospora
Lichen species
Lichens described in 2002
Lichens of Thailand
Taxa named by Brian John Coppins
Taxa named by Natsurang Homchantara